The Video Collection: '97–'03 is the first video album by Greek singer Despina Vandi, released in 2003 by Heaven Music in Greece and Cyprus. It features videos from the beginning of Vandi's collaboration with songwriter Phoebus since 1997. All of the music videos were directed by Kostas Kapetanidis.

Track listing
"Gia"
"Thelo Na Se Do"
"Olo Lipeis"
"Anaveis Foties/Deste Mou Ta Matia"
"Lathos Anthropos"
"Ela"
"I Melodia tis Monaxias"
"Simera"
"Ipofero"
"To Koritsaki Sou"
"Nihtolouloudo Mou"
"S'ta 'Dosa Ola"
"Lipame"
"Christougenna"
"Gia" (UK Version)

Charts

References

External links
 Official site

Albums produced by Phoebus (songwriter)
Despina Vandi video albums
Greek-language albums
Music videos directed by Kostas Kapetanidis
2004 video albums
2004 compilation albums
Music video compilation albums
Heaven Music compilation albums
Heaven Music video albums